Ridgely may refer to:

Places
 Ridgely, Maryland, U.S
Ridgely Airpark
 Ridgely, Missouri, U.S
 Ridgely, Tennessee, U.S
 Ridgely Township, Nicollet County, Minnesota, U.S.
 Fort Ridgely, a frontier U.S. Army outpost 1851–1867 in Minnesota Territory
Battle of Fort Ridgely

People

Given name
Ridgely Gaither (1903–1992), United States Army general 
Ridgely Hunt (1887–1933), American publishing executive and professor
Ridgely Johnson (born 1958), American rower
Ridgely Torrence (1874–1950), American poet and editor

Surname
Cleo Ridgely (1893–1962), film star 
Charles Ridgely (disambiguation), the name of several people
Edwin R. Ridgely (1844–1927), U.S. Representative from Kansas
Eliza Ridgely (1803–1867), American heiress
Henry M. Ridgely (1779–1847), American lawyer and U.S. Representative and U.S. Senator from Delaware
Henry du Pont Ridgely (born c. 1949), American judge
John Ridgely (1909–1968), American film character actor 
Mabel Lloyd Ridgely (1872–1962), American suffragist and historical preservationist
Priscilla Dorsey Ridgely (1762–1814), a First Lady of Maryland
Reginald H. Ridgely Jr. (1902–1979), American Marine general
Richard Ridgely (1869–1949), American actor and film director 
Robert Ridgely (1931–1997), American actor and voice artist
Robert S. Ridgely (born 1946), American ornithologist
William Barret Ridgely (1858–1920), a U.S. Comptroller of the Currency

See also

 Ridgeley (disambiguation)
 Ridgley (disambiguation)